Rhododendron macgregoriae is a rhododendron species native to Indonesia and Papua New Guinea at altitudes of . The flowers are light yellow to orange.

R. macgregoriae is relatively easy to grow in cultivation and a popular parent for hybrid cultivars. Today, nearly one hundred named cultivars are of "mac" descent.

References

 J. Bot. 29: 177 1891.
 The Plant List
 Vireya.net article
 Hirsutum.com
 Encyclopedia of Life

macgregoriae